Snargate is a village near New Romney in Kent, England.

Snargate was home to artist Harold Gilman, sometimes called the English Van Gogh. He was a British Impressionist and a member of the Camden Town Group. He grew up at Snargate Rectory, where his father was rector. Harold was born in 1876, and lived at the Rectory till his thirties, when he brought his bride Grace to live there, for the first two years of their marriage, 1902–04. His father continued to live there till his death in 1917. Harold Gilman only lived two years longer, dying in 1919 as one of the numerous victims of the so-called Spanish Influenza outbreak at the end of the First World War.

The painting "Interior" of about 1908 (Private Collection) is supposed to have been painted inside the Rectory.

Source: "The Painters of Camden Town", by F Farmar
(Christie's 1988), page 59.

Snargate has a well known pub, The Red Lion, which originates from the early 16th century and has been run by the current family since 1911 and, except for the odd lick of paint, has not been redecorated since 1890. This is a tiny pub with an antique marble bar top and bare wooden  floor. The draught beers, principally from independent Kentish brewers, are served directly from the cask. The walls are decorated with World War II era memorabilia. The pub, run by Doris Jemison until her death in April 2016 and now by her daughter Kate, has won a number of awards including CAMRA's Ashford Folkestone and Romney Marsh Branch Pub of the Year, the Kent CAMRA Pub of the Year, and the South East Regional Pub of the Year. It is a Grade II listed public house, and is on the Campaign for Real Ale's National Inventory of Historic Pub Interiors.

References

External links

Villages in Kent